Anthony Jelonch (born 28 July 1996) is a French rugby union flanker and he currently plays for Toulouse.

International career
Jelonch was part of the French squad for the 2017 France rugby union tour of South Africa.

On 17 July 2021, in the fifth minute of the third test between Australia and France, Marika Koroibete was sent off for a dangerous tackle on Jelonch. The red card was later rescinded by the World Rugby judiciary, who made the following finding, "No contact is made by the Player (Koroibete) on the French player higher than the neck region... The French player grabs at his face and falls to the ground but no contact was made in the tackle by the Player to the area he grabbed". In the view of the three-person committee, Jelonch was acting. Despite this incident, Australia went on to win the match 33-30, and the series 2-1.

International tries

Honours

International 
 France
Six Nations Championship: 2022
Grand Slam: 2022

Club 
 Castres
Top 14: 2017–18

References

External links
France profile at FFR
L'Équipe profile
ESPN Profile
Castres profile

1996 births
Living people
French rugby union players
Castres Olympique players
France international rugby union players
Rugby union flankers
Sportspeople from Gers
Stade Toulousain players